Jazz Conversations, The Other Side of Monday Michiru is a 2015 recording by jazz pianist Toshiko Akiyoshi and her daughter singer/flutist Monday Michiru, released in Japan by Victor Entertainment.

Track listing
"Long Yellow Road" (Akiyoshi, Michiru)
"First Night" (Akiyoshi)
"Love and Life" (Michiru)
"Warning: Success May Be Hazardous To Your Health" (Akiyoshi)
"New Girl In Town (Where Are We?)" (Michiru)
"Broken Dreams" (Tabackin, Michiru) 
"Dreaming" (Michiru)
"Ain't Gonna Ask No more" (Akiyoshi, Michiru)
"Frog" (Michiru)
"One Note Samba" (Jobim, Mendonça)

Personnel
Toshiko Akiyoshi – piano 
Monday Michiru – vocals, flute 
Paul Gill – bass
Mark Taylor – drums

References
Victor Entertainment VICJ-61740

Toshiko Akiyoshi albums
Monday Michiru albums
2015 albums